Adam Kocian (born 1 April 1995 in Andernach) is a German volleyball player, a member of the club United Volleys Frankfurt.

References

External links
Volleyball-Bundesliga profile
LZSPORT-PRO profile
Volleyball.World profile
Volleybox profile

1995 births
Living people
German men's volleyball players
People from Andernach
Sportspeople from Rhineland-Palatinate
21st-century German people